The Freeman Farm Historic District encompasses a historic farm property in Gray, Maine.  The  parcel, originally platted out in 1791, was owned and operated by five generations of the Freeman family, and is emblematic of the changes in agricultural practices over a period of more than 150 years.  It was listed on the National Register of Historic Places in 2003.

Description and history
The former Freeman Farm is located in southern Gray, on the west side of West Gray Road (United States Route 202) north of its junction with Maine State Route 115. The farm complex is set near the road, and includes the main house, a barn, chicken house, and garage. The former family cemetery (its remains reinterred in the town cemetery) lies at the northwest corner of the cultivated lands.

The farmhouse is a 1-1/2 story Cape style wood frame structure, with a central chimney, side gable roof, and long ell extending to the south and west.  It was built about 1812 by Jonathan Freeman III, and retains internal finishes and hardware.  The barn is a typical New England bank barn of the period, built in the 1830s, and the chicken house was added in the 1880s.  The garage is a modern (1960s) addition.

The property was worked by five generations of Freemans.  At first, it was probably a subsistence operation, with excess produce sold at local markets.  Later in the 19th century, with the arrival of the railroad in the area, George H. Freeman, Jr. apparently began bringing products to markets in Portland.  Following his death in 1915, the property was taken over by his son, George L. Freeman.  A civic engineer by trade, he operated the property as a gentleman's farm, living there full-time only in retirement.  This practice was maintained by his son.  The property was sold out of the family after his death in 2000.  It is the subject of a preservation easement, held by the Windham Land Trust, that restricts its uses significantly.

See also
National Register of Historic Places listings in Cumberland County, Maine

References

Farms on the National Register of Historic Places in Maine
Federal architecture in Maine
Buildings and structures completed in 1812
Houses in Cumberland County, Maine
Gray, Maine
Historic districts on the National Register of Historic Places in Maine
National Register of Historic Places in Cumberland County, Maine
Historic districts in Cumberland County, Maine
Farms in Cumberland County, Maine